Khwaja Abu Nasr Parsa (died 1461) was a 15th-century Sufi of the Naqshbandi order from the city of Balkh.

References

Sources 
 

Akbarian Sufis
People from Balkh
Naqshbandi order
1461 deaths
Year of birth unknown